Fe is the debut album by Chicago-based alternative country band Souled American. It was released in 1988 by Rough Trade Records, and re-released, as part of the Framed box set, by tUMULt Records in 1999. The title of the album (pronounced "fee") was taken from the word used by Bob Marley for "feel".

Track listing
 "Notes Campfire" – (4:52)
 "Field & Stream" – (3:16)
 "Soldier's Joy" – (2:34)
 "Full Picture" – (2:37)
 "Make Me Laugh Make Me Cry" – (4:03)
 "Fisher's Hornpipe" – (2:33)
 "Tall Boy Blues" – (3:39)
 "Magic Bullets" – (3:22)
 "Lottery Brazil" – (3:15)
 "Goin' Home" – (4:24)
 "She Broke My Heart" – (4:45)
 "True Swamp Too" – (3:48)
 "Feel Better" – (3:33)

All songs by Souled American except "Soldier's Joy" and "Fisher's Hornpipe" traditionals.

Personnel
 Joe Adducci – bass, vocals
 Jamey Barnard – drums
 Chris Grigoroff – guitar, vocals
 Scott Tuma – guitar
 Bob Egan – pedal steel on "Tall Boy Blues", "She Broke My Heart"

References

 Chicago Tribune: "You Never Know: The Texas Trip That Paid Off for Souled American", by Tom Popson, October 14, 1988.
 Chicago Sun-Times: "Album feels good to Souled American", by Don McLeese, May 26, 1989.

1980 debut albums
Souled American albums
Rough Trade Records albums